Sederrik Cunningham (born July 14, 1989) is an American football wide receiver who is a free agent. Cunningham played college football at Furman University and attended Zephyrhills High School in Zephyrhills, Florida. He has been a member of the Green Bay Packers, Calgary Stampeders and Edmonton Eskimos. Currently working as pass game coordinator for Prince George Kodiaks

College career
Cunningham played for the Furman Paladins from 2008 to 2011, catching 95 passes for 1,196 yards and 7 touchdowns in 44 games.

Professional career
Cunningham was signed by the Green Bay Packers of the National Football League on April 15, 2013. He spent the 2013 season on injured reserve. He was released by the Packers on April 11, 2014. Cunningham signed with the Calgary Stampeders of the Canadian Football League (CFL) on May 8, 2014. He made his CFL debut on July 12, 2014. He was released by the Stampeders on July 21, 2015. On September 15, 2015, Cunningham was signed to the practice roster of the Edmonton Eskimos of the CFL. He was promoted to the active roster on October 2 and added back to the practice roster on October 8, 2015. He was released by the team on May 28, 2016. Cunningham participated in The Spring League in 2017.

References

External links
Edmonton Eskimos bio 
Calgary Stampeders bio

1989 births
Living people
African-American players of American football
African-American players of Canadian football
American football wide receivers
Calgary Stampeders players
Canadian football wide receivers
Edmonton Elks players
Furman Paladins football players
Green Bay Packers players
The Spring League players
People from Zephyrhills, Florida
Players of American football from Florida
21st-century African-American sportspeople
20th-century African-American people